Delivered From Evil is a non-fiction book about World War II which was written by Robert Leckie, an American author of popular books about the military history of the United States.
Each chapter of this book is a biography, and a narrative also runs through the book. The narrative of the book is the history of World War II. The characters appear in the book as they rise to importance in the narrative.

History books about World War II